QHS, qhs, or q.h.s. may refer to:

Medicine
 q.h.s., qhs or qHS, Latin for "every night at bedtime", an abbreviation used in medical prescriptions
A post-nominal used by the Queen's Honorary Surgeon, a member of the Medical Household, U.K.

Other
 Qedemawi Haile Selassie (1892–1975), Emperor of Ethiopia
 Queensferry High School, a secondary school in Scotland
 Quincy High School (disambiguation), any of several high schools in the United States
 Quincy Historical Society, the historical society of Quincy, Massachusetts, United States